Anthyllis coccinea is a species of flowering plant native to Europe. This plant is sometimes considered as Anthyllis vulneraria var. coccinea.

References

Other sources
 Anthyllis vulneraria var. coccinea (accessed 5 March 2020)

coccinea